Collins Industries is an American bus manufacturer headquartered in Hutchinson, Kansas.  Best known for production of yellow school buses, the company produces buses for multiple applications; all bodies designed by the company have been produced for cutaway van chassis.

Collins was founded in 1967 by Don Collins, Sr. as E-CON-O Conversion; originally a part of Collins Industries, the company exists today as a wholly owned subsidiary of manufacturing company REV Group.  All production is sourced from a 94,000 square-foot facility from South Hutchinson, Kansas.

History

1970s 
In 1967, Don Collins founded E-CON-O Conversion in Kansas City, Missouri, becoming one of the first to develop a school bus derived from a van.  Utilizing a Ford Falcon van (Econoline passenger van), Collins shifted away from designs based upon utility vehicles such as the Chevrolet Suburban and International Harvester Travelall.

In 1971, Collins replaced E-CON-O with Collins Industries, expanding its product range into ambulances.  In 1972, the company was relocated to Hutchinson, Kansas (its present-day location).

1980s 
In 1982, Collins introduced its first bus with a wheelchair lift; in a shift away from van conversions, the company adopted bodies for cutaway van chassis, introducing the long-running "Bantam" product line.  In the mid-1980s, the company would diversify its product ranges.  To replace the Collins van-based ambulances, the company acquired Wheeled Coach Industries in 1984 (inventor of the modular ambulance) and Capacity of Texas (a terminal tractor manufacturer) in 1985.

1990s 
During the 1990s, Collins Industries grew to become the largest manufacturer of Type A small school buses in the United States.  In 1998, the company would acquire its largest competitor, Mid Bus (a successor of the bus manufacturing operations of Superior Coach Company).  To expand into the transit bus segment, Collins acquired World Trans, Inc, basing their vehicles on cutaway chassis and rear-engine chassis.

In 2000, the company purchased Waldon Manufacturing, renaming it after its Lay-Mor street sweeper.

2000s 
During the 2000s, the existence of Collins would transition significantly, shifting from a parent company to a subsidiary within a transportation conglomerate.  Although specializing solely in small buses, in 2000, Collins offered the widest product line of any American bus manufacturer, with three different versions of the Bantam.

A publicly traded company since 1983, Collins Industries became privately held in October 2006.  80 percent of the company was acquired by BNS Holding Inc, with the investment group American Industrial Partners holding the other 20 percent.

In 2007, Collins purchased the assets of Quebec-based manufacturer Les Enterprises Michel Corbeil out of bankruptcy.  As with its Mid Bus acquisition a decade before, Collins shifted production of Corbeil buses to its Kansas facility, repackaging it as a product range marketed in Canada.  Both subsidiaries adopted the Bantam bodywork, marketed as the Mid Bus Guide and Corbeil Quantum, respectively.

2010s 
In 2010, American Industrial Partners formed Allied Specialty Vehicles out of four of its transportation holdings, including Collins and its subsidiary companies.  Under ASV, Collins was part of a conglomerate including fire/emergency vehicles, recreational vehicles, transit and school buses, and industrial vehicles.  In 2015, Allied Specialty Vehicles was renamed the REV Group.

On March 29, 2012, Collins unveiled the Nexbus series, replacing the long-running Bantam series; the first Nexbus was produced on May 16, 2012.  In place of the former Guide and Quantum, all three Collins brands adopted Nexbus branding. In 2014, collins starting manufactured the Nexbus using the Ford Transit 350/350HD chassis.  By 2016, Collins retired the Mid Bus and Corbeil brands entirely, using the Collins brand across North America.

For 2018, Collins introduced the Collins Low Floor variant of the Nexbus body.  The first school bus derived from the Ram ProMaster body, the Low Floor is equipped with a flat floor and a folding wheelchair ramp.

Products

References

External links

 

Bus manufacturers of the United States
School bus manufacturers
Emergency services equipment makers
Companies based in Kansas
Reno County, Kansas
1971 establishments in Kansas
Manufacturing companies established in 1971
American companies established in 1971